
The Best of Bruce Dickinson is a compilation album released in 2001 by Bruce Dickinson. Two versions were released; a single disc version and a bonus disc version. On the front cover, the album title is imposed upon the seal of the demon Astaroth.

Disc 1 is a selection of songs from his previous solo albums, with the addition of two new songs, "Broken" and "Silver Wings", both of which were written by Dickinson and guitarist/producer Roy Z. Disc 2 contains rare songs, most of which have appeared as b-sides on singles. The track "The Voice of Crube" is an explanation of the various songs, narrated by Bruce (for whom 'Crube' is an anagram).

Track listing

Personnel
 Bruce Dickinson – vocals
 Roy Z – guitar, piano, mellotron
 Adrian Smith – guitar
 Janick Gers – guitar
 Eddie "Cheddar" Casillas – bass
 Alex Dickson – guitar
 Andy Carr – bass
 Chris Dale – bass
 Doug Vanbooven – percussion
 Fabio del Rio – drums
 Alessandro Elena – drums
 Dickie Fliszar – drums
 Dave Ingraham – drums
 Alan Siviter – drums (on "Dracula")
 Doug Siviter – bass (on "Dracula")
 Baz Eardley – guitar (on "Dracula")

Production
 Producers: Jack Endino, Shay Baby, Roy Z
 Engineers: Jack Endino, Spencer May
 Mixing: Spencer May, Shay Baby

References

2001 greatest hits albums
Bruce Dickinson albums
Albums produced by Jack Endino
Albums produced by Roy Z